Catenanuova (Sicilian: Catinanova) is a town and comune in the province of Enna, in the region of Sicily in southern Italy.

Geography
It is connected to the latter and to Palermo by both railway and the A19 highway.

Climate
Catenanuova's ambient temperature and rainfall are recorded by a remote telemetry station operated by Sicily's Department of Water and Waste, which on August 10, 1999 measured a maximum of 48.5 °C (119.3 °F),. However, Catenanuova is not a World Meteorological Organization surface station – the nearest being c. away at Enna – and the WMO's officially recognised European maximum is 48.0 °C (118.4 °F), recorded on July 10, 1977 in Athens, Greece.

History
Catenanuova was founded between 1727 and 1733 by Andrea Giuseppe Riggio-Statella, Prince of Aci Catena, to fulfil the last wishes of his mother, the Baroness Anna Maria Statella (died 1717) who wanted "to revive happy memories of childhood" after the 1693 Sicily earthquake had decimated her husband's family. A notarized document dated February 9, 1733 attests to the existence of Catenanuova at that date. Between 1731 and 1736 Catenanuova became a small urban center with full autonomy. The name of the town derived from Aci Catena and changed from Terra della Nuova Catena to Catena la Nuova to the present Catenanuova.

Economy
Catenanuova is classified as rural municipality. The main activities are agriculture (wheat, citrus, vegetables), and craft manufacturing (in iron and wood). The entrepreneurship index of Catenanuova was 43.27/1000 pop in 2001.

References

External links
News, forum, photos and videos about Catenanuova
Info about Catenanuova

Municipalities of the Province of Enna
Populated places established in 1733
1733 establishments in Italy